L'agenzia dei bugiardi is a 2019 Italian comedy film directed by Volfango De Biasi.

The film is a remake of the 2017 French film Alibi.com.

Cast

References

External links

2019 films
Films directed by Volfango De Biasi
2010s Italian-language films
Italian remakes of French films
2019 comedy films
Italian comedy films
2010s Italian films